Barão Vermelho is the first album by Brazilian rock band Barão Vermelho, released in 1982.  The album includes the song "Todo Amor Que Houver Nessa Vida" (All The Love There Is In This Life), which became one of the band's classics.

Track listing 
 "Possando de Star" (Posing as a Star) - 2:18 
 "Down em Mim" (Down on Me) – 3:15 
 "Conto de Fadas" (Fairytale) – 3:39 
 "Billy Negão" – 3:23 
 "Certo Dia na Cidade" (Certain Day on the City) – 4:43 
 "Rock 'n Geral" (Rock 'n' General) – 2:43 
 "Ponto Fraco" (Weak Point) – 2:54 
 "Por Aí" (Somewhere) – 3:40 
 "Todo Amor Que Houver Nessa Vida" (All The Love There Is In This Life) – 2:15 
 "Bilhetinho Azul" (Little Blue Note) - 2:19

Personnel 
 Cazuza: vocals
 Roberto Frejat: guitar
 Maurício Barros: keyboards
 Dé: bass
 Guto Goffi: drums, percussion

Som Livre albums
Barão Vermelho albums
1982 albums